For information on all State University of New York at Cortland sports, see Cortland Red Dragons

The Cortland Red Dragons football program is the intercollegiate American football team for the State University of New York at Cortland. The team competes in the NCAA Division III, and is a member of the Empire 8. The team plays its home games at SUNY Cortland Stadium Complex in Cortland, New York. The Red Dragons are led by Curt Fitzpatrick, who has served as head coach since 2020.

Year-by-year results
Statistics correct as of the end of the 2012–13 college football season

* All seven wins from the 2009 season were later vacated by the NCAA.

Rivalries

Ithaca Bombers

Notable former players

 Scott Israel (BA, '77), quarterback, former sheriff of Broward County, Florida, current police chief of Opa-locka, Florida.
 Jake Ceresna ('16), NFL defensive end for the New York Giants
 Kevin James, actor and comedian
 Ryan McCarthy ('02), head football coach at Central Connecticut University 
 John Moiseichik, professional basketball player in the National Basketball League
 Craig Peterson, American football placekicker in the Indoor Football League 
 Dan Pitcher ('11), NFL coach
 R-Kal Truluck, NFL defensive end for the Kansas City Chiefs, Green Bay Packers, and Arizona Cardinals

References

External links